M123 may refer to:

M-123 (Michigan highway), a state highway
M123 10-ton 6x6 truck, an American military vehicle
Mercedes-Benz M123 engine, an automobile engine
Malaysia Federal Route M123, a major road in Malacca and Johor state, Malaysia